The 16th Ibero-American Championships in Athletics were held at the Estádio Ícaro de Castro Melo in São Paulo, Brazil, between August 1-3, 2014. 

A total of 44 events were contested, 22 by men and 22 by women. 

A detailed report on the event and an appraisal of the results was given.

Medal summary

The results and medal winners were published.

Men

Women

Medal table (unofficial)
A medal table was published.

Participation
According to an unofficial count, 294 athletes from 22 countries participated.

 (5)
 (20)
 (3)
 (75)
 (16)
 (28)
 (10)
 (2)
 (20)
 (11)
 (2)
 (1)
 (3)
 (18)
 (8)
 (8)
 (15)
 (9)
 (8)
 (20)
 (7)
 (5)

References

Ibero-American Championships in Athletics
International sports competitions in São Paulo
International athletics competitions hosted by Brazil
Ibero-American Championships
Ibero-American Championships
Ibero-American Championships in Athletics